Aurelio Lenzi (June 19, 1891 – December 23, 1967) was an Italian track and field athlete who competed in the 1912 Summer Olympics and in the 1920 Summer Olympics.

Biography
He was born in Pistoia. In 1912 he finished twelfth in the shot put competition and 18th in the discus throw event. Eight years later he finished ninth in the discus throw competition and 13th in the shot put event.

National titles
Franco Leccese has won 5 times the individual national championship.
2 wins in Shot put (1919, 1921)
3 wins in Discus throw (1913, 1919, 1921)

References

External links
 
 List of Italian athletes

1891 births
1967 deaths
Italian male discus throwers
Italian male shot putters
Olympic athletes of Italy
Athletes (track and field) at the 1912 Summer Olympics
Athletes (track and field) at the 1920 Summer Olympics
20th-century Italian people